Allison Cook may refer to:

Allison Claire Cook, an injured victim of the 2007 Virginia Tech shooting
Allison Tranquilli, formerly Cook, Australian basketball player